Maraldi may refer to:
 Maraldi (lunar crater)
 Maraldi (Martian crater)
 Mons Maraldi, a mountain on the Moon

People with the surname
Giacomo Filippo Maraldi (1665–1729), French-Italian astronomer and mathematician
Giovanni Domenico Maraldi (1709–1788), Italian astronomer, grandson of Giacomo Filippo